Klem (stylised as KLEM) is a 2023 Dutch film directed by Frank Ketelaar. The film won the Golden Film award after having sold 100,000 tickets. The film is based on the television series with the same name.

Barry Atsma, Jacob Derwig and Georgina Verbaan play roles in the film. Principal photography took place from March to May 2022 in Tuscany, Italy.

References

External links 
 

2023 films
2020s Dutch-language films
Films directed by Frank Ketelaar
Films shot in Tuscany
Films set in Tuscany
2023 drama films
Films based on television series